Fabio Lopez (born 17 June 1973) is an Italian football manager of Spanish descent and a former footballer. Lopez has coached many Italian academy clubs, scouted for Atalanta B.C. and ACF Fiorentina, and managed a number of clubs throughout Eastern Europe and Asia. He holds a UEFA Pro Coaching Licence.

Lopez's first senior managerial role was at FK Banga Gargždai, starting in January 2007. He is known for his strong leadership qualities, his ability to analyse and solve problems and his excellent interpersonal and communication skills with players.

He has been the head coach of Vietnamese club Thanh Hóa since 22 November 2019 and was sacked on 7 June 2020.

Playing career

A goalkeeper, Lopez started his playing career in the affiliated academy of A.S. Roma. Ultimately, he was forced into early retirement as a result of a serious knee injury picked up while playing with Agiatese in the 1992–93 season.

Early years
Lopez graduated secondary school with a diploma in Rome. After retiring as a footballer, he went on to become a football coach for a number of semi-professional club and youth teams.He obtained his UEFA Youth Coaching Licence in 2000.

Coaching career

FK Banga Gargždai
In the 2007–08 season, Lopez was approached by Lithuanian club FK Banga Gargždai as to take over as head coach (for the first time in his career). The season was very successful as the club reached cup the semi-finals and recorded the best defensive record in the league, conceding only 15 goals all season while suffering only 6 defeats. In 2008, he was an instructor of the UEFA B course for the Lithuanian Football Federation.

FK Šiauliai
In the 2008–09 season, after success with FK Banga Gargždai, Lopez was hired by FC Siauliai. The club finished in fourth place in the league, in a season that included a record 11 consecutive games unbeaten.

Sabah FA
In 2011, Lopez was approached by Sabah FA in Malaysia's Liga Premier competition to become their manager, however the club ultimately appointed him as technical director. After eight months, Lopez resigned from the role and moved to Indonesia where he coached Premier League club, PSMS Medan.

PSMS Medan
In 2012, Lopez saved the team from relegation with two games in advance. The club occupied a lowly league position upon his arrival, however he was able to secure safety by changing the mentality of the team.

B.G. Sports Club
Lopez was then hired by Maldivian Premier League side B.G. Sports Club. Like his previous club, PSMS Madan, B.G. were also in a poor league position at the time of Lopez's arrival, their first 4 games all ending in defeat. After a series of important positive results, the team reached third place by the end of the season, which was considered a great success.

Bangladesh national team
On 11 September 2015 Lopez was hired by the Bangladesh national team, 
He was hired with a short 4-month contract only for the qualifying matches at the 2018 World Cup in Russia

Al-Orouba SC
Lopez's next role was at Omani club Al-Orouba SC, however once again his time was cut short, this time due to 'a difference in philosophy between the manager and the board'.

Al-Ahli under 23s
After a 6-month coaching hiatus, Lopez returned to the managerial world by taking up a position as under 23s coach for Al-Ahli. Lying in 6th position at the time of his takeover, the club has registered 9 consecutive wins since his arrival, reaching the record of 7 victories without ever suffering a goal, taking them up to 2nd on the ladder.

Borneo FC 
On 5 January 2018 Lopez was hired as the new coach of Indonesian Liga 1 club Borneo FC, replacing Dejan Antonic. On 23 April 2019, he terminated his contract binding him to his employer by mutual consent of both parties.

Thanh Hóa Football Club 
On 22 November 2019 Lopez was hired as the new coach of Vietnamese club Thanh Hóa. After got only one win and four loss in the first five-game, he was sacked on 7 June 2020.

Scouting career

Atalanta B.C.
In 2003, Lopez became a scout for Atalanta B.C, where he remained until 2005.

ACF Fiorentina
In 2005, Lopez moved from Atalanta to become a scout for ACF Fiorentina.

Managerial statistics

Managerial honours

Regional Cup Championship -

Three Regional Cup –

3 Place A Lyga FK Siauliai Championship

3 Place B.G. Sports Club Championship

2 Place Al-Ahli Saudi FC

Personal life

Lopez is fluent in three languages (English, Italian & Lithuanian).

References

Bahagia tangani klub maladewa 
Lopez sfida Zeman
Tangani skuat asing ipl 
"Banga" pratęsė sutartį su treneriu iš Italijos
 Chiamata da miami Fabio Lopez
Allenatore giramondo Fabio Lopez
BG appoints Lopez as coach 
Indonesia News 
National Team Malaysia Fabio Lopez 
Қазақстан футболына қызыққан Италия бапкері 
Morocco Interview خاص: "المدرب الإيطالي لوپيز يتحدث عن الكرة الوطنية"  
Kemenangan perdanapsms ipl 
In Italia poche possibilita per i giovani
CLB Thanh Hóa bổ nhiệm Fabio Lopez làm HLV trưởng

External links

1973 births
Living people
Italian people of Spanish descent
Italian football managers
Italian expatriate football managers
Expatriate football managers in Lithuania
Italian expatriate sportspeople in Lithuania
FK Banga Gargždai managers
PSMS Medan